El Tren Fantasma is a 2011 album by Chris Watson. It was released on 14 November 2011 by independent record label Touch Music on CD and 12" vinyl record.

Background 
On January 26, 1999, the fourth episode "Los Mochis to Veracruz" of the fourth season of Great Railway Journeys was broadcast. The episode was presented by chef Rick Stein and featured the "Ghost Train" which traveled over a now-defunct railway Ferrocarriles Nacionales de México between Los Mochis to Veracruz. Chris Watson spent a month (or five weeks) working as a BBC audio recorder for the programme. In 2010, El Tren Fantasma was broadcast on BBC Radio 4.

Track listing

CD release

The Signal Man's Mix iTunes release

The Signal Man's Mix vinyl release

Reception 

Pitchforks Grayson Currin called El Tren Fantasma for "one of the best works of his career" with "an [sic] sonic adventure that consistently shifts from power electronics-like heaviness to the sunny-day delicacy." BBC Musics Spencer Grady praised the album for "Watson's ability to create whole worlds, entire lifetimes in the listener's imagination, beyond the moment of recording, comes to the fore." Musicworkss René van Peer also favoured the album with "[Watson] has painted fantastic, surreal images in sound."

Allmusics Ned Raggett reviewed the album with "it's a marvelous portrayal in miniature of the tensions between the 'natural' and the 'man-made'." The Quietuss Luke Turner said it was a "haunting, powerful tribute and memorial to a marvel of engineering and the people who built, worked and travelled upon it."

Personnel
Production
Jon Wozencroft – art direction
Denis Blackham – mastered by
Caminos de Hierro – photography by
Ana Gonzalez Bello – voice actor [station announcer]

References

External links
Touch Music page

Touch Music albums
2011 albums
Albums about trains
Electronic albums by English artists
Experimental music albums by English artists
Zoomusicology
Field recording